Li Wenlong (born 4 February 2001) is a Chinese short track speed-skater. He represented China at the 2022 Winter Olympics.

Career
Wenlong represented China at the 2022 Winter Olympics in the men's 1000 metres event and won a silver medal.

References

External links

2001 births
Living people
People from Fushun
Chinese male short track speed skaters
Olympic short track speed skaters of China
Short track speed skaters at the 2022 Winter Olympics
Medalists at the 2022 Winter Olympics
Olympic silver medalists for China
Olympic medalists in short track speed skating
Sportspeople from Liaoning
21st-century Chinese people